Hard Skool is a single and the fourth extended play by the American hard rock band Guns N' Roses. The single was released on September 24, 2021, with the EP following on February 25, 2022. The EP consists of two recent singles and two live tracks, and is their first EP release with guitarist Slash and bassist Duff McKagan since they rejoined the band in 2016.

Background
The tracks "Absurd" and "Hard Skool" were initially written during the Chinese Democracy sessions. "Absurd" (known previously as "Silkworms") was performed live four times in 2001, before leaking online in 2018. A snippet of "Hard Skool" was posted online in 2006, with the full version leaking in 2019, under the working title "Jackie Chan".

A reworked version of "Absurd" was performed live for the first time on August 3, 2021. It was released as a single three days later, marking the group's first release of new material since the release of Chinese Democracy in 2008. It was also the first new Guns N' Roses track to feature guitarist Slash and bassist Duff McKagan since the release of 1994's "Sympathy for the Devil". "Hard Skool" was performed at soundcheck by members of the band on September 16, 2021. It was then released as a single on September 24. The track peaked at number 9 on the Billboard Mainstream Rock Airplay chart. The official lyric video of the song debuted on Good Morning Football on December 3, 2021.

The Hard Skool EP was announced on September 25, 2021. Exclusive to the band's online store, it features live versions of "You're Crazy" and "Don't Cry", songs originally released on 1987's Appetite for Destruction and 1991's Use Your Illusion I, respectively. The EP became available on CD, vinyl and cassette on February 25, 2022. A second 7-inch vinyl version was released June 2022 to the Nightrain fan club. It  features "Hard Skool" and a new live version of "Shadow of Your Love".

Reception
Classic Rocks Stephen Hill gave "Absurd" a positive review, noting how the track makes the band "sound genuinely pumped up, aggressive and full of boisterous energy". However, Loudwire noted a divide among audiences, with some "digging the track" while others "don't seem so into it". "Hard Skool" was more well received, with several publications describing it as "vintage" Guns N' Roses.

Track listing

Charts

References

2022 EPs
Geffen Records EPs
Guns N' Roses EPs